Haycraft is an English surname. Notable people with the surname include:

Eliza Haycraft (1820–1871), American brothel madam and philanthropist
James Haycraft (1865–1942), English cricketer
John Berry Haycraft (1859–1922), English physiologist
John Haycraft (1926–1996), English educator and writer
Julius E. Haycraft (1871-1951), American lawyer, judge, and politician
Ken Haycraft (1907–1995), American football player
Molly Costain Haycraft (1911–2005), Canadian writer
Thomas Haycraft (1859–1936), British barrister

See also
Haycraft Commission

English-language surnames